Karlbo is a village in Avesta Municipality, Dalarna, Sweden. Erik Axel Karlfeldt was born here.

External links
http://www.maplandia.com/sweden/dalarnes-lan/avesta-kommun/karlbo/

Populated places in Dalarna County